A museum ship, also called a memorial ship, is a ship that has been preserved and converted into a museum open to the public for educational or memorial purposes. Some are also used for training and recruitment purposes, mostly for the small number of museum ships that are still operational and thus capable of regular movement.

Several hundred museum ships are kept around the world, with around 175 of them organised in the Historic Naval Ships Association though many are not naval museum ships, from general merchant ships to tugs and lightships. Many, if not most, museum ships are also associated with a maritime museum.

Significance

Relatively few ships are preserved beyond their useful life, due to the high cost of maintaining them against the ravages of the elements. Most are broken up and sold for scrap, while a relative handful are sunk as naval target practice, scuttled to create artificial reefs, and so on. Some survive because of historical significance, but more often due to luck and circumstance. Since an old ship tied up at dockside, without attention, still decays and eventually sinks, the practice of recent years has been to form some sort of preservation society, solicit donations from governments or private individuals, organize volunteer labor from the enthusiasts, and open the restored ship to visitors, usually for a fee.

The restoration and maintenance of museum ships presents problems for historians who are asked for advice, and the results periodically generate some controversy. For instance, the rigging of sailing ships has almost never survived, and so the rigging plan must be reconstructed from various sources. Studying the ships also allows historians to analyze how life on and operation of the ships took place. Numerous scientific papers have been written on ship restoration and maintenance, and international conferences are held discussing the latest developments. Some years ago, the Barcelona Charter was signed by a variety of international owner organizations of traditional vessels, and provides certain accepted minimum criteria for the restoration and operation of traditional watercraft still in operation.

Another consideration is the distinction between a "real" museum ship, and a ship replica. As repairs accumulate over time, less and less of the ship is of the original materials, and the lack of old parts (or even "appropriate" work tools) may lead to the use of modern "short-cuts" (such as welding a metal plate instead of riveting it, as would be the case during the ships' historical period). Visitors without historical background are also often unable to distinguish between a historical museum ship and a (more-or-less historically relevant) ship replica, which may serve solely as a tourist attraction.

Museum usage

Typically the visitor enters via gangplank, wanders around on the deck, then goes below, usually using the original stairways, giving a sense of how the crew got around. The interior features restored but inactivated equipment, enhanced with mementos including old photographs, explanatory displays, pages from the ship's logs, menus, and the like. Some add recorded sound effects, audio tours or video displays to enhance the experience. When the USN turns over one of their ships to a museum, a contract must be signed, stating that the Navy bears no responsibility for the costs of restoration, preservation and maintenance. Also, major pieces of equipment such as engines and generators must be permanently disabled. If the ship requires services such as electricity and water, they must come through shore connections.

In some cases, the ships radio room has been brought back into use, with volunteers operating amateur radio equipment. Often, the callsign assigned is a variation on the original identification of the ship. For example, the submarine , which had the call NBQV, is now on the air as NB9QV. The World War II submarine , berthed at the San Francisco Maritime National Historical Park, had the wartime call NJVT and is now on the air as NJ6VT. This radio work not only helps restore part of the vessel, but also provides worldwide publicity for the museum ship.

A number of the larger museum ships have begun to offer hosting for weddings, meetings, other events, and sleepovers, and on a few ships still seaworthy, cruises. In the United States, this includes s annual "turnaround", when the old ship is towed out into the harbor and brought back in facing the other way, so as to weather evenly. A place on the deck is by invitation or lottery only, and highly prized.

Many consider the tourism appeal of an interesting old vessel on the city waterfront strong enough that any port city should showcase one or more museum ships. This may even include building a replica ship at great expense.

Gallery

See also
List of museum ships

References

Further reading
Aymar, B. (1967). A pictorial treasury of the marine museums of the world; A guide to the maritime collections, restorations, replicas, and marine museums in twenty-three countries. New York: Crown.
Evans, M. H., & West, J. (1998). Maritime museums: A guide to the collections and museum ships in Britain and Ireland. London: Chatham Pub.
Stammers, M. (1978). Discovering maritime museums and historic ships. Discovering series, no. 228. Aylesbury [England]: Shire Publications
Sullivan, D. (1978). Old ships, boats & maritime museums. London: Coracle Books.
Heidbrink, I. (1994). Schrott oder Kulturgut. Zur Bewertung historischer Wasserfahrzeuge aus der Perspektive des Historikers. Bestandserfassung - Bewertung - quellengerechte Erhaltung. Lage / Lippe: Fritz Heidbrink.

External links

Historic Naval Ship Visitors' Guide (from the international Historic Naval Ships Association website)

 
Ship types
Ship